Evimirus is a genus of mites in the family Eviphididae. There are about three described species in Evimirus.

Species
These five species belong to the genus Evimirus:
 Evimirus breviscuti Karg & Schorlemmer, 2009
 Evimirus pentagonius Karg, 1996
 Evimirus uropodinus (Berlese, 1903)

References

Mesostigmata
Articles created by Qbugbot
Taxa named by Wolfgang Karg